Phacelia (phacelia, scorpionweed, heliotrope) is a genus of about 200 species of annual or perennial herbaceous plants in the borage family, native to North and South America. California is particularly rich in species with over 90 recorded in the region. 

The genus is traditionally placed at family rank with the waterleafs (Hydrophyllaceae) in the order Boraginales. The Angiosperm Phylogeny Group, recognizing that the traditional Boraginaceae and Hydrophyllaceae are paraphyletic with respect to each other, merges the latter into the former and considers the family basal in the Euasterids I clade. Other botanists continue to recognize the Hydrophyllaceae and Boraginales after analysing the secondary structure of the ITS1 genetic region rather than its sequence for these higher taxonomic levels.  This placed Phacelia within the Hydrophyllaceae. Further molecular taxonomic analysis of the Boraginales has divided the Boraginales in two and placed Phacelia among the monophyletic herbaceous Hydrophyllaceae in Boraginales II.

The genus includes both annual and perennial species. Many have been cultivated as garden and honey plants.

There are reports that glandular hairs of stems, flowers and leaves of some species of Phacelia secrete oil droplets that can cause an unpleasant skin rash (contact dermatitis) in some people, specifically from P. brachyloba, P. campanularia, P. crenulata, P. gina-glenneae, P. grandiflora, P. ixodes, P. minor, and P. pedicellata. The major contact allergen of P. crenulata has been identified as geranylhydroquinone and of P. minor as geranylgeranylhydroquinone.

The mining bee Andrena phaceliae is a specialist pollinator of this genus in the Eastern United States

Selected species

See also
List of Phacelia species

References

Further reading
  (2000): The phylogeny of the Asteridae sensu lato based on chloroplast ndhF gene sequences. Mol. Phylogenet. Evol. 16: 96–112.

External links

Panorama of a Phacelia Field (QuickTime required)

 
Boraginaceae genera
Garden plants